Rosa Anna Katharina Mittermaier-Neureuther (5 August 1950 – 4 January 2023) was a German alpine skier. She was the overall World Cup champion in 1976 and a double gold medalist at the 1976 Winter Olympics.

Mittermaier competed in alpine skiing from 1967 to 1976, retiring after a highly successful season in which she finished with two Olympic gold medals and ranked first in the World Cup. She remained popular, advertising for sports and as a non-fiction writer. She was known as Gold-Rosi, and she was inducted into Germany's Sports Hall of Fame in April 2006 when it was initiated.

Life and career 
Her father had run there the Passauer Hütte. A certified skiing instructor, he also owned a skiing school from 1966, and was the first to train his daughters.

Racing career 
Mittermaier made her World Cup debut in the inaugural season of 1967, and won her first World Cup race two seasons later.

She won two gold medals (downhill and slalom) and one silver (giant slalom) at the 1976 Winter Olympics in Innsbruck. Her victory in the Olympic downhill was the only downhill win in her international career. Mittermaier was the most successful athlete at those games, along with cross-country skier Raisa Smetanina of the Soviet Union, earning her the nickname of Gold-Rosi within Germany (then West Germany).

In addition to the overall World Cup title, she also won the season title in slalom and combined in 1976. After winning both races at Copper Mountain in Colorado to wrap up the overall and slalom titles, the four-year-old resort immediately named the race course run after her. In addition to her success in international competition, she also won 16 German national titles during her career.

On 31 May 1976, she retired from international competition at age 25, following the very successful 1976 season.

After racing 
After her career in sports, Mittermaier joined Mark McCormack's International Management Group as the only German alongside Jean-Claude Killy, Jackie Stewart, and Björn Borg. During her three-year contract, she designed a collection of winter sports clothing and made international appearances for various skiing products. She wrote non-fiction books, often together with her husband. She worked for several charities and occasionally as a commentator for German television for major sporting events. She established a charitable foundation to aid children with rheumatism in 2000.

Personal life and death 
Mittermaier was born with a twin sister who died at birth. Her younger sister Evi Mittermaier also competed as an alpine skier and previously lived in a hotel. Rosi and Evi also recorded two albums of Bavarian folk songs together.

In 1980 she married Christian Neureuther, winner of six World Cup slalom races. They are the parents of Felix Neureuther (b. 1984), a World Cup ski racer for Germany, and a daughter Ameli who works as a fashion designer.

Mittermaier died in Garmisch-Partenkirchen on 4 January 2023, at the age of 72.

Awards 
 1976 German Sportswoman of the Year
 1999 Olympic Order
 2001 Goldene Sportpyramide of the 
 2005 Order of Merit of the Federal Republic of Germany
 2006 Germany's Sports Hall of Fame
 2007 Bavarian Order of Merit

She was an honorary citizen's of Garmisch-Partenkirchen and Reit im Winkl.

World Cup results

Season standings 
Source:

Points were only awarded for top ten finishes (see scoring system).

Season titles

Race victories 
 10 wins – (1 GS, 8 SL, 1 K)
 41 podiums – (4 DH, 11 GS, 22 SL, 4 K)

World championship results 
Source:

From 1948 through 1980, the Winter Olympics were also the World Championships for alpine skiing.

At the World Championships from 1954 through 1980, the combined was a "paper race" using the results of the three events (DH, GS, SL).

Olympic results 
Source:

Publications 
Many of her books were written with her husband Christian Neureuther:

See also 
 List of FIS Alpine Ski World Cup women's race winners

Notes

References

Further reading

Biographies

Obituaries

External links 
  

 

 

1950 births
2023 deaths
German female alpine skiers
Olympic alpine skiers of West Germany
Olympic gold medalists for West Germany
Olympic silver medalists for West Germany
Olympic medalists in alpine skiing
Medalists at the 1976 Winter Olympics
Alpine skiers at the 1976 Winter Olympics
Alpine skiers at the 1972 Winter Olympics
Alpine skiers at the 1968 Winter Olympics
Recipients of the Cross of the Order of Merit of the Federal Republic of Germany
FIS Alpine Ski World Cup champions
People from Traunstein (district)
Sportspeople from Upper Bavaria